Juan Vázquez Tenreiro (14 July 1912 — 14 April 1957) was a Spanish footballer who played as a forward.

He earned his only international cap for Spain on 16 March 1941 in a 5–1 friendly win over Portugal at the Estadio de San Mamés in Bilbao, as an Atlético Madrid (then known as Atlético Aviación) player.

References
 
 
 

1912 births
1957 deaths
Spanish footballers
Footballers from Ferrol, Spain
Association football forwards
La Liga players
Segunda División players
Tercera División players
Racing de Ferrol footballers
Deportivo de La Coruña players
Atlético Madrid footballers
RC Celta de Vigo players
Spain international footballers
Spanish football managers
Segunda División managers
Racing de Ferrol managers